Marthe Haaland Wang (born 25 October 1990 in Bergen, Norway) is a Norwegian singer-songwriter and the cousin of upright bassist Ellen Andrea Wang.

Biography 
Wang released her debut album Ut Og Se Noe Annet (2017). The album was well received in Norwegian media and nominated for the 2017 Spellemannprisen in the Folk category.

Discography 
 2017: Ut Og Se Noe Annet (Kirkelig Kulturverksted)
 2020: Bakkekontakt (Self-released)

References

External links 
 

21st-century Norwegian singers
Norwegian folk singers
Norwegian composers
Musicians from Bergen
1990 births
Living people
People educated at Langhaugen Upper Secondary School
21st-century Norwegian women singers